is a former Japanese football player.

Playing career
Hasegawa was born in Toyama Prefecture on February 26, 1981. After graduating from high school, he joined newly was promoted to the J2 League club Albirex Niigata in 1999. Although he played several matches as midfielder until 2001, he did not play many matches and left the club at the end of the 2001 season. In 2002, he entered Kokushikan University. After graduating from Kokushikan University, he joined his local club, Valiente Toyama in the Regional Leagues in 2006. Although he played in many matches in 2006, his opportunity to play decreased in 2007 and he retired at the end of the 2007 season.

Club statistics

References

External links

Profile at albirex.co.jp

1981 births
Living people
Kokushikan University alumni
Association football people from Toyama Prefecture
Japanese footballers
J2 League players
Albirex Niigata players
Association football midfielders